Crassula columnaris is a succulent plant native to South Africa and Namibia.

References

columnaris
Flora of the Cape Provinces
Flora of Namibia
Plants described in 1778